Clencio Pinto  is an Indian professional footballer who plays as a midfielder for Churchill Brothers in the I-League.

Career
Born in Goa, Pinto was part of the Dempo youth system, playing with their under-19s from 2011 to 2014. While with Dempo, Pinto joined both Margao and Wilfred Leisure on loan in the Goa Professional League to gain senior experience, before appearing for Dempo in the same league during the 2013–14 season. In 2015, after leaving Dempo, Pinto played in the Goa Professional League with Cavelossim.

On 23 April 2016, during the last game of the I-League season, Pinto made his professional debut for Salgaocar against Sporting Goa. He started the match and played the whole first half as Salgaocar lost 3–0.

Career statistics

References

Living people
Indian footballers
Dempo SC players
Salgaocar FC players
Association football midfielders
Footballers from Goa
Goa Professional League players
I-League players
1995 births
Churchill Brothers FC Goa players